The second and final season of the American comedy-drama television series The Carrie Diaries premiered on The CW on October 25, 2013, and concluded on January 31, 2014, consisting of 13 episodes. The series serves as a prequel to the HBO series Sex and the City.

Cast and characters

Main
 AnnaSophia Robb as Carrie Bradshaw
 Austin Butler as Sebastian Kydd
 Lindsey Gort as Samantha Jones
 Ellen Wong as Jill "Mouse" Chen
 Katie Findlay as Maggie Landers
 Stefania Owen as Dorrit Bradshaw
 Brendan Dooling as Walt Reynolds
 Chloe Bridges as Donna LaDonna
 Freema Agyeman as Larissa Loughlin
 Matt Letscher as Tom Bradshaw

Recurring
 R.J. Brown as Thomas West
 Jake Robinson as Bennet Wilcox
 Scott Cohen as Harlan Silver
 Chris Wood as Adam Weaver

Guest
 Evan Crooks as Miller
 Alexandra Miller and Whitney Vance as the Jens
 Nadia Dajani as Deb
 Terry Serpico as Mr. Kydd
 Kate Nowlin as Barbara
 Josh Salatin as Simon Byrnes
 Molly Sims as Vicky Donovan
 Noelle Beck as Mrs. Kydd
 Boris McGiver as Eddie Landers
 Giullian Yao Gioiello as Scott
 Claybourne Elder as Pete
 John Boyd as Elliot

Episodes

Ratings

In the netlet's target demo W18–34, the season premiere averaged 0.3, doubling the numbers with the following episode to 0.6. The third episode of the season slipped to 0.5 points. The fourth episode surged to 0.7, a new season high in that demo. The fifth episode of the season fell to 0.3. However, the sixth episode rose to 0.5. The seventh episode dropped to 0.4. The midseason finale rose to 0.5. The ninth episode rose again, this time to 0.6. The tenth episode dropped to 0.4. The eleventh episode rose to 0.5. The penultimate episode scored a 0.6. The season finale tumbled to 0.4.

References

2013 American television seasons
2014 American television seasons